This is a list of notable secondary schools in Ethiopia.

Addis Ababa 

 Bright Future School
 Dejazmach Wondirad School
Ayer Tena Secondary School
Dandii Boru School 
 Bingham Academy
 Cistercian Monastery
 Ethio-Parents' School
 Joy Academy
 Hillside School
 International Community School of Addis Ababa (formerly American Community School)
 Istituto Statale Italiano Omnicomprensivo di Addis Abeba
 Lideta Catholic Cathedral School
 Lycée Guebre-Mariam
 Menelik II School
 Nativity Girls School
 One Planet International School 
 St John Baptist De La Salle Catholic School, Addis Ababa 
 St. Joseph School
 Zagol Academy
 Dimond Academy
 Ergib School
 Menelik II School

Dogu'a Tembien 
 Atse Yohannes School (Zala)
 Mashih school
 May Sa'iri school
 Ra'isot school
 Kolal school
 Afedena school
 Amanit school

Other areas 
 Bethel Evangelical Secondary School, Dembidolo
 Addis Alem Senior Secondary School, Addis Alem, Oromia Region
 Bilate Tena Secondary and Preparatory School, Dimtu, Wolaita, Ethiopia
 SOS Hermann Gmeiner school Hawassa

See also

 Education in Ethiopia
 List of schools by country
 List of universities and colleges in Ethiopia

References

External links
All School Ethiopia
Ethiopia School Directory
School in Ethiopia list

Schools
Schools
Schools
Ethiopia
Ethiopia
 *